The Meadows may refer to:

Places

Municipalities and locales
 The Meadows (Key West), a neighborhood in Key West, Florida, United States
 The Meadows, Castle Rock, Colorado, a community in the United States
 The Meadows, Edmonton, a residential district in Edmonton, Alberta, Canada
 The Meadows, Florida, a census-designated place (CDP) in Sarasota County, Florida, United States
 The Meadows, Nottingham, an area of Nottingham, England
 The Meadows, Virginia, an unincorporated community in Northampton County, Virginia, United States
 The Meadows, a wetland area adjacent to the River Dee in Chester, England

Listings on the U.S. National Register of Historic Places
 The Meadows (Battleboro, North Carolina), listed on the NRHP in North Carolina
 The Meadows (Fletcher, North Carolina), listed on the NRHP in North Carolina
 The Meadows (Franklin, New Jersey), listed on the NRHP in New Jersey
 The Meadows (Moorefield, West Virginia), listed on the NRHP in West Virginia
 The Meadows (Owings Mills, Maryland), listed on the NRHP in Maryland

Other places 

 The Meadows, Edinburgh, public park in Scotland
 The Meadows at Grand Valley State University, golf course in Michigan
 The Meadows Greyhounds, racing track in Melbourne, Australia

Businesses and enterprises
 The Meadows Casino & Hotel, a defunct hotel-casino in the Las Vegas, Nevada area 
 The Meadows Foundation (Dallas), a private philanthropic institution in Texas 
 The Meadows Music & Arts Festival, former festival in New York City 
 The Meadows Racetrack and Casino, a standard-bred harness racing track and slot machine casino in Meadow Lands, Washington County, Pennsylvania, United States

Schools
 The Meadows Elementary School (DeSoto, Texas), a public school in DeSoto, Texas
 The Meadows School, a private school in Las Vegas, Nevada
 The Meadows School, Leek, a special school in Leek, Staffordshire, England

See also
 Meadow (disambiguation)
 Meadowlands (disambiguation)
 Mountain Meadows (disambiguation)
 Mountain Meadow (disambiguation)